Mark Innes (born 27 September 1978) is a Scottish former footballer who played as a defender.

He spent the entirety of his nine-year professional career in the third tier of English football, making 177 league and 26 cup appearances. His career began with Oldham Athletic in 1997, and continued with Chesterfield between 2001 and 2005. He spent the final two years of his career playing for Port Vale, before a serious injury he sustained on trial at St Mirren ended his professional playing career. After becoming a qualified tiler he turned out for non-league side Hyde United between 2007 and 2009, before moving on to New Mills for a two-year spell. In 2011, he signed with Mossley, but after just two months of the 2011–12 season, he was to return to New Mills.

Career
Innes started his career with Second Division side Oldham Athletic, signing professional forms at the start of the 1997–98 season. He first established himself in the first team in the 1999–2000 and 2000–01 campaigns, making 24 and 38 appearances over all competitions respectively.

Out of favour at the start of the 2001–02 season, he was loaned out to Chesterfield in December 2001 in a one-month spell. He scored on his club debut, in a 2–2 draw with Brighton & Hove Albion on 21 December. He moved permanently to Saltergate at the end of his spell, and finished the season with two goals and 23 appearances to his name. After he picked up a calf injury in September 2002, Innes was limited him to just ten games in 2002–03. However his performances over 23 games in the 2003–04 campaign saw him rewarded him with a new one-year contract. Following 22 appearances the following season, he was released by the club in March 2005.

He signed with Port Vale days after his release from Chesterfield, and signed a twelve-month contract in June 2005. He was a first team feature at Vale Park until February 2006, at which point he fell out of the first team picture and was released when his contract was up at the end of the 2006–07 season. Back in his native Scotland he went on trial at St Mirren, where an achilles injury ended his professional career, also leaving him with a lengthy rehabilitation period.

He returned to England and joined Conference North club Hyde United in 2007 whilst also working as a tiler – he had come into the tiling profession after the PFA helped him onto a training course. Enjoying regular first team football with 67 performances over two seasons, he was not offered a new contract in summer 2009.

Upon his release from Hyde, Innes dropped several divisions to join New Mills in the North West Counties Football League. Following a second-place finish in 2009–10, New Mills won promotion out of the Premier Division in the 2010–11 season, finishing as champions with 102 points. They were rewarded with a place in the Northern Premier League Division One South. In June 2011 he joined Mossley in the Northern Premier League Division One North. The "Lilywhites" finished in 14th place in 2011–12. However, Innes was to play little part in the season as he rejoined New Mills at the end of September 2011 and made his second debut for the club in the 2–2 away draw at Shepshed Dynamo on 1 October 2011. The club finished in ninth place in 2011–12.

Career statistics

Honours
New Mills
North West Counties Football League Premier Division: 2010–11

References

External links

1978 births
Living people
Footballers from Bellshill
Scottish footballers
Association football defenders
Oldham Athletic A.F.C. players
Chesterfield F.C. players
Port Vale F.C. players
Hyde United F.C. players
New Mills A.F.C. players
Mossley A.F.C. players
English Football League players
National League (English football) players
Northern Premier League players